Rômulo Duncan Arantes Filho (usually Rômulo Arantes; June 12, 1957 – June 10, 2000) was a Brazilian swimmer and actor. He won a bronze medal in the 100-metre backstroke at the 1978 World Aquatics Championships and four medals at the Universiades (1977 and 1981) and Pan American Games (1979). He also competed in eight events at the 1972, 1976 and 1980 Summer Olympics with the best achievement of fifth place in the 4×100-metre medley relay in 1972.

He participated at the inaugural World Aquatics Championships in 1973 Belgrade, where he finished 7th in the 100-metre backstroke, breaking the South American record, with a time of 1:00.37. In the 200-metre backstroke, he not qualified for the final, but also broke the South American record, with a time of 2:12.98.

He competed in the 1975 World Aquatics Championships in Cali. In the 100-metre backstroke, he finished 10th, with a time of 1:00.30, far from his personal best at this moment, the South American record (58.61 seconds). In the 4×100-metre medley, he finished 9th, with a time of 4:01.99, along with Sérgio Pinto Ribeiro, Heliani dos Santos and Ruy de Oliveira. Arantes had contracted a virus that made him stop training for a month, which hurt his results in this World Championships.

He was at the 1975 Pan American Games, in Mexico City. He won the bronze medal in the 100-metre backstroke, 4×100-metre medley and 4×200-metre freestyle. He also finished 4th in the 200-metre backstroke.

At the 1977 Summer Universiade, held in Sofia, Arantes won a gold medal in the 100-metre backstroke. At the 1979 Summer Universiade, held in Mexico City, Arantes won a silver medal in the 100-metre backstroke. At the 1981 Summer Universiade, held in Bucharest, Arantes won two bronze medals in the 100-metre backstroke and in the 4×100-metre medley relay.

Around 1977–1981, he studied business administration and trained at Indiana University Bloomington, and graduated with a bachelor's degree in 1981. After retiring from swimming in the early 1980s, he became a notable national film and TV actor, and was a singer with his music band.

Family and death
He was a son of Rômulo Duncan Arantes, thus his full name literally means Rômulo Duncan Arantes, Jr. ( = son). In the 1990s, Arantes became an amateur pilot and even built a landing strip at his farm near Maripá de Minas. Two days before his 43 birthday, while his family was preparing for celebrations at the farm, he flew an ultralight plane Ultravia Pelican with 24-year-old friend Fábio Amorim Ribeiro Ruivo. Minutes after take-off, the plane crashed, just some 500 meters from the runway, instantly killing both men.

His widow Valéria Braga (b. 1955) is a businesswoman. His son Rômulo Neto (b. 1987) and daughter Cloé Schmidt Arantes are also actors and models.

References

External links
 

1957 births
2000 deaths
Swimmers from Rio de Janeiro (city)
Swimmers at the 1972 Summer Olympics
Swimmers at the 1975 Pan American Games
Swimmers at the 1976 Summer Olympics
Swimmers at the 1979 Pan American Games
Swimmers at the 1980 Summer Olympics
Olympic swimmers of Brazil
Indiana University Bloomington alumni
Aviators killed in aviation accidents or incidents in Brazil
20th-century Brazilian male actors
World Aquatics Championships medalists in swimming
Pan American Games silver medalists for Brazil
Pan American Games bronze medalists for Brazil
Pan American Games medalists in swimming
Universiade medalists in swimming
Universiade gold medalists for Brazil
Universiade silver medalists for Brazil
Universiade bronze medalists for Brazil
Victims of aviation accidents or incidents in 2000
Medalists at the 1977 Summer Universiade
Medalists at the 1979 Summer Universiade
Medalists at the 1981 Summer Universiade
Medalists at the 1975 Pan American Games
Medalists at the 1979 Pan American Games